The United States of America has sent athletes to every celebration of the Winter Olympic Games. The United States Olympic & Paralympic Committee (USOPC) is the National Olympic Committee for the United States.

Hosted Games
The United States has hosted the Winter Games on four occasions, more than any other nation:

Medal tables

Red border color indicates host nation status.

Medals by Winter Games

Medals by winter sport

Updated on December 31, 2021

*''This table includes two medals – one silver awarded in the ice hockey and one bronze awarded in the figure skating events at the 1920 Summer Olympics.

The United States has never won an Olympic medal in the following current winter sport: Biathlon.

Flagbearers

Medals by winter sport

Current sports

Ice hockey

Russia–United States rivalry
Russia (in all its incarnations) and the United States have won more Olympic medals than any other nation. Russia topped the overall medal count at 7 Summer Olympics and 9 Winter Olympics, while the United States placed first at 17 Summer Olympics and 1 Winter Olympics. The countries developed a strong rivalry during the Cold War, and while the tensions eased in the 1990s, the relations deteriorated in 2014 and 2016, and the rivalry became even more heated.

Since the 1952 Summer Olympics, Russia has won 1902 Summer and Winter Olympics medals, the most in that period, while the United States has won 1873 medals, the second most in that period.
Detailed comparison is presented below.

Winter Olympics
Medal totals of the Soviet Union/Unified Team/Russia/Olympic Athletes from Russia and the United States since 1956, when the Soviet Union started to compete.

Overall, the United States (1924–present) has won 113 gold and 330 total medals, and Russia (1956–present) has won 142 gold and 386 total medals.

Ice hockey

The 1980 hockey game between the U.S. and USSR was dubbed the "Miracle on Ice", when American college players defeated the heavily favored seasoned professionals from the Soviet Union on the way to a gold medal at the Winter Olympics in Lake Placid, New York. The Soviet Union had won the gold medal in five of the six previous Winter Olympic Games, and were the favorites to win once more. Though ice hockey is not a major sport in most areas of the United States, the "Miracle" is often listed as one of the all-time greatest American sporting achievements. The U.S. also won the gold medal in the 1960 Games at Squaw Valley, California, defeating the Soviet Union, Canada, Czechoslovakia, and Sweden along the way. However, since this victory is not as well known as the 1980 win, it has come to be known as the "Forgotten Miracle".

The U.S. and the Soviet Union next met at the Olympics in 1988. As in 1980, the Soviets were represented by their star-studded veterans, while the Americans fielded a team of college players. The Soviets won the encounter 7–5 and went on to win the gold medal, while the U.S. placed seventh.

The two teams met again at the 1992 Olympics in a semi-final match. There, the Unified Team (the successor to the Soviet Union) won 5–2. While some stars had left the Soviet Union to play in the NHL, the Unified Team still boasted many veterans from their domestic professional league, while the Americans were represented primarily by college players. The Unified Team eventually won the gold medal, while the U.S. placed fourth.

The U.S. and Russia (the successor to the Unified Team) met twice at the 1996 World Cup of Hockey. The Americans won both games 5–2 en route to the tournament championship.

The U.S., coached by Herb Brooks, and Russia, coached by Slava Fetisov, met twice in the 2002 Winter Olympics in Salt Lake City, which included a 2–2 round-robin draw and a 3–2 semi-final win for the Americans. The semi-final match was played 22 years to the day after the "Miracle on Ice" game. The U.S. eventually won silver, while Russia won bronze.

The two teams met in the quarterfinals of the 2004 World Cup of Hockey, with the U.S. earning a decisive 5–3 victory.

The U.S. and Russia played each other in a round-robin game at the 2014 Winter Olympics in Sochi. The game was tied 2–2 after overtime before the Americans prevailed in an eight-round shootout, with T.J. Oshie scoring on 4 of 6 attempts for the United States. The match has been dubbed by some as the "Marathon on Ice" due to its length. Both teams, however, failed to medal; the Americans finished fourth (losing in the semis to Canada and to Finland in the bronze medal game), while the Russians placed fifth (losing to Finland in the quarterfinals).

See also
United States at the Olympics
United States at the Summer Olympics
List of United States Olympic medalists

References

External links